The Road to Oxiana is a travelogue by the explorer Robert Byron, first published in 1937. It documents Byron's travels around Persia and Afghanistan, and is considered one of the most influential travel books of the 1930s. The word "Oxiana" in the title refers to the ancient name for the region along Afghanistan's northern border.

Plot

The book is an account of Byron's ten-month journey in the Middle East, Afghanistan and India in 1933–34, initially in the company of Christopher Sykes. It is in the form of a diary with the first entry "Venice, 20 August 1933" after which Byron travelled by ship to the island of Cyprus and then on to the countries of Palestine, Syria, Iraq, Iran and Afghanistan. The journey ended in Peshawar, India (now part of Pakistan) on 19 June 1934, from where he returned to England.

The primary purpose of the journey was to visit the region's architectural treasures of which Byron had an extensive knowledge, as evidenced by his observations along the way. For example, he says of the Mosque of Sheikh Lutfullah, now listed as a World Heritage Site by UNESCO:

Byron interacted with the locals and negotiated transport, including motor vehicles, horses and asses to carry him on his journey. He encountered heat, cold, hunger and thirst and suffered the inconvenience of bugs, fleas, lice and physical illness.

List of places visited in The Road to Oxiana

Robert Byron's journey in this book starts with the first entry on 20 August 1933 and ends on 8 July 1934. The following are the places that have entries in the book (NB spellings used by the author sometimes differ from contemporary usage):

 Venice
 SS Italia
 Kyrenia
 Nicosia
 Famagusta
 Larnaca
 SS Martha washington
 Jerusalem
 Damascus
 Beirut
 Baghdad
 Kirmanshah
 Teheran
 Gulhek
 Zinjan
 Tabriz
 Maragha

 Tasr kand
 Saoma
 Kala julk
 Ak bulagh
 Ayn varzan
 Shahrud
 Nishapur
 Meshed
 Herat
 Karokh
 Kala nao
 Laman
 Qom
 Delijan
 Isfahan
 Abadeh
 Shiraz

 Kavar
 Firuzabad
 Ibrahimabad
 Kazerun
 Persepolis
 Yezd
 Bahramabad
 Kirman
 Mahun
 Sultaniya
 Shahi
 Asterabad
 Gumbad-i-kabus
 Bandar Shah
 Samnan
 Damghan
 Abbasabad

 Kariz
 Moghor
 Bala Murghab
 Maimena
 Andkhoi
 Mazar-i-Sharif
 Robat
 Khan Abad
 Bamian
 Shibar
 Charikar
 Kabul
 Ghazni
 Peshawar

Reception and reviews

The writer Paul Fussell wrote that The Road to Oxiana is to the travel book what "Ulysses is to the novel between the wars, and what The Waste Land is to poetry."

The travel writer Bruce Chatwin in his introduction to the book has described it as "a sacred text, beyond criticism," and carried his copy since he was fifteen years old, "spineless and floodstained" after four journeys through Central Asia.

References

External links
 Blogger SquareKufic has a series of posts on the monuments described in the book, including many of the photos taken by Robert Byron himself.
 
The Road to Oxiana, excerpts
Google Books extracts from 1982 edition

British travel books
Architecture books
Architectural history
1937 books
Books about the Middle East
English non-fiction books
Books about Afghanistan
Books about Iran